Pouakai may refer to:

 an alternative spelling of Poukai, a bird monster in Polynesian mythology who ate humans
 Haast's Eagle, an extinct bird of New Zealand
 Pouakai Range, an eroded, extinct volcano on the northern flank of Mount Taranaki